Rauf Dimraj is a football executive and coach who has been associated with KF Tirana for many years as a fitness coach and sporting director. On 21 May 2014 he was named as the vice minister of education and sport by the Prime Minister of Albania Edi Rama.

References

Association football executives
Living people
Year of birth missing (living people)